Bridgetown is a hamlet in the parish of Werrington, Cornwall. It has a Methodist chapel.

References

Hamlets in Cornwall